Cryptolechia epidesma is a moth in the family Depressariidae. It was described by Walsingham in 1912. It is found in Mexico to Guyana.

The wingspan is about 16 mm. The forewings are dark purplish-fuscous with a narrow irregular-edged pale whitish-yellowish streak along the costa from the base to near the apex, the costal edge sprinkled with black towards the base. There is a slightly waved yellow-whitish line along the termen. The hindwings are rather dark grey.

References

Moths described in 1914
Cryptolechia (moth)